Cardinale is a surname. Notable people with the surname include:

 Claudia Cardinale (born 1938), Tunisian-born Italian actress
 Gerald Cardinale (1934–2021), American politician
 Igino Eugenio Cardinale (1916–1983), Italian Roman Catholic archbishop and diplomat
 Lindsey Cardinale (born 1985), American singer
 Marco Cardinale (born 1973), Italian sports scientist and administrator
 Salvatore Cardinale (born 1948), Italian politician
 Tina Cardinale-Beauchemin (born 1966), American athlete

See also
 Cardenal
 Cardinal (disambiguation)
 Cardinali (disambiguation)